is a Japanese actor.

Saotome was represented with Gekidan Sujaku until its dissolution. He is currently represented with Avex Management.

Biography
Saotome's height is 1.72 metres, and his shoe size is 27 centimetres. His skills are sword fighting and dancing nichibu.

Saotome is nicknamed .

He is good in table tennis and association football. Saotome's favorite food is meat, in particular grilled liver.

Filmography

Stage

Variety series

References

External links
 Official fan club 
 Avex Management official profile 
 Sujaku official profile 

Japanese male stage actors
1996 births
Living people
People from Kitakyushu
21st-century Japanese male actors